The Hon. Ashley George John Ponsonby  (24 June 1831 – 12 January 1898) was a British Liberal politician.

Background
Ponsonby was a younger son of William Ponsonby, 1st Baron de Mauley, third son of Frederick Ponsonby, 3rd Earl of Bessborough. His mother was Lady Barbara, daughter of Anthony Ashley-Cooper, 5th Earl of Shaftesbury.

Political and military career
Ponsonby sat as Member of Parliament for Cirencester between 1852 and 1857 and again between 1859 and 1865. He was also a captain in the Grenadier Guards and a Justice of the Peace and Deputy Lieutenant of Gloucestershire.

Family
Ponsonby married Louisa Frances Charlotte, daughter of Lord Henry Gordon, in 1857. They had two sons and one daughter. He died in January 1898, aged 66. His wife died in February 1910.

He lived at Prince's Gardens in London and at Heatherfield in Ascot, Berkshire, now Heatherwood Hospital.

References

External links 
 

1831 births
1898 deaths
Younger sons of barons
Liberal Party (UK) MPs for English constituencies
UK MPs 1852–1857
UK MPs 1859–1865
Grenadier Guards officers
Deputy Lieutenants of Gloucestershire
Members of London County Council
Progressive Party (London) politicians
Ashley